Ahmed Ounaies, also spelled Ahmed Ounaiss, (born 25 January 1936) is a Tunisian politician and diplomat who was Foreign Minister for two weeks in the transitional government established after the 2010–2011 Tunisian uprising. Public pressure forced him to resign a week after controversially praising French Minister Michèle Alliot-Marie, who openly supported Ben Ali and helped deliver tear gas to police forces. He was only in office for two weeks.

His predecessor who was Ben Ali's foreign minister — Kamel Morjane — had also resigned from his post. His successor — Mouldi Kefi — was appointed on 21 February 2011.

Minister of Foreign Affairs
On January 29, after a week of protests in Egypt he said Tunisia and Egypt are different and both must "chart their own course". He also emphasized that Tunisia in not going to involve itself in Egypt.

Controversy and resignation
In his trip to Paris, he angered many Tunisians by stating he had always dreamed of meeting French Foreign Minister Alliot-Marie. He went on to praise her by stating she was "above all a friend of Tunisia". In Tunis, about 300 employees of the foreign ministry staged a protest rally outside their workplace to demand that he step down after his comments. Hundreds more joined the protest.

After only two weeks as foreign minister, he resigned on 13 February 2011.

Honours 
 2018 : Grand officier of the National Order of Merit of Tunisia

See also
Government Mohamed Ghannouchi

References

1936 births
Living people
People from Tunis
Government ministers of Tunisia
People of the Tunisian Revolution
Foreign ministers of Tunisia